"Can't Get Any Harder" is a song by American singer James Brown from his fifty-sixth studio album Universal James. It was released in January 1993 via Scotti Brothers Records as the album's lead single. Written by C+C Music Factory members Robert Clivillés and David Cole, Trilogy's Duran Ramos, and Leaders of the New School, it was produced by Clivillés and Cole with co-production by Ricky Crespo, and features guest rap vocals from Trilogy and Leaders of the New School.

The single peaked at number 59 on the UK Singles Chart, as well as number 76 on the Hot R&B/Hip-Hop Songs and number 7 on the Dance Singles Sales, making it Brown's last charting single in the United States. It was also a Brown's final music video to date featured a live dancer and college students.

Critical reception
It was poorly received by critics; AllMusic described it as "strain[ing] for rap credibility", while Entertainment Weekly dismissed it as "junky".

Track listing

Personnel
James Brown – vocals
Trilogy – rap vocals
Bryan "Charlie Brown" Higgins – songwriter, rap vocals, additional producer (track 4)
Sheldon "Cut Monitor Milo" Scott – songwriter, rap vocals, additional producer (track 4)
Trevor "Busta Rhymes" Smith – songwriter, rap vocals, additional producer (track 4)
James "Dinco D" Jackson – songwriter, rap vocals, additional producer (track 4)
Robert Clivillés – songwriter, producer, arranger, editing, mixing, remixing
David Cole – songwriter, producer, arranger, mixing, remixing
Ricky Crespo – additional producer, programming, editing
Alan Friedman – programming
Acar Key – recording, mixing, engineering
Katherine Miller – recording, engineering
Richard Joseph – recording, engineering
Herbert Powers Jr. – mastering

Charts

References

External links

1992 songs
1993 singles
James Brown songs
Songs written by Busta Rhymes
Scotti Brothers Records singles
Songs written by Robert Clivillés
Song recordings produced by Robert Clivillés
Songs written by David Cole (record producer)